Ronneby BK is a Swedish football club located in Ronneby.

Background
Ronneby BK currently advanced to Division 3 Blekinge which is the fifth tier of Swedish football. They play their home matches at the Brunnsvallen in Ronneby.

The club is affiliated to Blekinge Fotbollförbund. Ronneby BK have competed in the Svenska Cupen on 17 occasions.

Season to season

Footnotes

External links
 Ronneby BK – Official website

Football clubs in Blekinge County